WAYN may refer to:

 WAYN (AM), a radio station (900 AM) licensed to Rockingham, North Carolina, United States
 WAYN (website), a social networking website whose name is an acronym for "Where Are You Now?"